This is a list of episodes from 2018 for the Stuff You Should Know podcast.

2018 season
 Short Stuff (2018)

References

External links 
 Podcast Archive

Lists of radio series episodes